Yesagyo is a town in the Magway Division in Myanmar. It is situated on the Chindwin River, near the site where it flows into Irrawaddy River. It is the principal town and administrative seat of Yesagyo Township.Yesagyo is a second biggest city of Pakokku District.

The town is served by the Chaung-U to Pakokku railway.

Populated places in Magway Region
Township capitals of Myanmar